Gurrl Down is the twelfth Bravo stand-up comedy special by stand-up comedian Kathy Griffin and fourteenth overall.

Track listing

Personnel

Technical and production
Andy Cohen - executive producer (as Andrew Cohen)
Kathy Griffin - executive producer
Jenn Levy - executive producer
Paul Miller - executive producer
Kimber Rickabaugh - executive producer
Jeff U'ren - production design
Bruce Ryan - production design
Gene Crowe - associate director, stage manager
Lesley Maynard - production supervisor
Cisco Henson - executive in charge of production
Dave Bell - production assistant
Lindsay Eberly - production assistant
Danielle Iacovelli - production assistant
Steven H. Kaplan - production assistant
James Lovewell - production assistant
Jonathan White - production assistant

Visuals and imagery
Ashlee Mullen - hair stylist / makeup artist
Tad Davis - audio assist
Paul Lennon - lighting director
Simon Miles - lighting designer
Michael Mulvey - jib operator

References

External links
Kathy Griffin's Official Website

Kathy Griffin albums
Stand-up comedy albums
2011 live albums